Aldershot is a rural town and locality in the Fraser Coast Region, Queensland, Australia.

Geography
The Bruce Highway passes through from south to north-west. Saltwater Creek, a tributary of the Mary River, runs through the locality from west to east, passing south of the town. The North Coast railway line forms part of the southern boundary and then passes through the locality and town from south to north.

History
The Queensland Smelting Company named the town after Aldershot in England. The company was established in England in 1888 and in 1893 built a smelter in the area. The smelter operated until 1906, when it was relocated to North Queensland to be closer to the mining areas.

Aldershot Post Office opened on 1 September 1892 and closed around 1920.

A primary school opened in Aldershot in 1894. It appears to have closed by 1911, when tenders were called to relocate the school buildings to Maryborough West and the teacher's residence to Gayndah.

Economy
The major industry in Aldershot today is the Maryborough Correctional Centre located at Stein Road.

References

External links
 

Towns in Queensland
Fraser Coast Region
Localities in Queensland